Simoliophiidae is an extinct family of limbed Tethyan marine snakes of the order Squamata. The name Pachyophiidae has also been used for this group, but Simoliophiidae has priority.

References 

Prehistoric snakes
Marine reptiles
Alethinophidia
Prehistoric reptile families